The Tall Building Awards or CTBUH Awards recognizes projects and individuals who have made an extraordinary contribution to the advancement of tall buildings and urban environment, as well as achieving sustainability at the highest and broadest level. The annual awards are judged by an independent panel of experts commissioned by the Council on Tall Buildings and Urban Habitat (CTBUH), a non-profit organization headquartered in Chicago, Illinois. As of 2019, there are two individual lifetime achievement awards, The Lynn S. Beedle Lifetime Achievement Award and Fazlur Khan Lifetime Achievement Medal, and several categorical awards for projects and structures.

In 2019 the CTBUH award categories were changed from buildings in specific regions to buildings based on height, region, function, innovation, construction, design, engineering, and safety. The most prestigious annual award, the Overall Best Tall Building Worldwide is awarded to one of the specific categorical winners. In 2010, the CTBUH conferred the Global Icon Award, an award for a unique tall building with a profound impact both locally and globally, to the Burj Khalifa in Dubai, United Arab Emirates.

Awards Criteria

Individual awards
Originally conceived in 2002, the first CTBUH Award, the Lynn S. Beedle Lifetime Achievement Award recognizes an individual who has made extraordinary contributions to the advancement of tall buildings and the urban environment during his or her professional career. The 2002 award was given and named after Lynn S. Beedle, an American structural engineer and founder of the Council on Tall Buildings And Urban Habitat. In 2004 a second lifetime award was created, the Fazlur R. Kahn Lifetime Award, named after Bangladeshi-American structural engineer and architect Fazlur Rahman Khan, which recognizes an individual for demonstrated excellence in technical design and/or research that has made a significant contribution to a discipline for the design of tall buildings and the built urban environment. The award was first given in 2004 to Leslie E. Robertson, an American engineer and lead structural engineer of the Twin Towers of the original World Trade Center in New York City.

Beginning in 2006 the CTBUH Awards began recognizing CTBUH Fellows for their contribution to the Council over an extended period of time, and in recognition of their work and the sharing of their knowledge in the design and construction of tall buildings and the urban habitat. The first CTBUH Fellows in 2006 were A. Eugene Kohn, Charles A. DeBenedittis, Gilberto do Valle, and Henry Jack Cowan.

Structural awards
The Council on Tall Buildings and Urban Habitat added two categories starting in 2007 which recognize completed structures for excellence. The Best Tall Building Award recognizes projects that have made extraordinary contributions to the advancement of tall buildings and the urban environment, and that achieve sustainability and wellness at the highest and broadest level. The Beetham Tower, completed in 2006 in Manchester, England was the first recipient of the award. The second award added in 2007 was the Best Sustainable Building Award, which was awarded to Hearst Tower, completed in 2006 in New York City.

In 2008, the second year of CTBUH Awards for structures, the Council on Tall Buildings and Urban Habitat added four geographical categories for the best tall building, the regions were Americas (North and South), Asia & Australasia, Europe, and Middle East & Africa. The Best Tall Building Award was then awarded to one of the regional award winners. In 2008 the CTBUH Best Tall Building Award winners were New York Times Building in New York City; Shanghai World Financial Center in Shanghai, China; 51 Lime Street in London, England; and Bahrain World Trade Center in Manama, Bahrain. The Best Tall Building Award Winner Worldwide was announced as the Asia & Australasia winner the Shanghai World Financial Center. The Best Tall Building Award categories based on the four regions would remain in place until 2019, when new categories were added based on sustainability and building height.

In 2013 a new 10 Year Award was added. In 2014 the Urban Habitat and Performance awards were issued for the first time.
The CTBUH uses the following award criteria for skyscrapers.

The project must be completed and occupied (topped out architecturally, fully clad, and at least partially occupied), no earlier than 1 January of the previous year, and no later than 1 October of the current awards year.
The project advanced architectural form, structure, building systems, sustainable design strategies, and provides life safety for its occupants.
The project must exhibited sustainable qualities at a broadest level.
The project must have achieved a high standard of excellence and quality.
The site planning and response to its immediate context must ensure rich and meaningful urban environments.
The contributions of the project should be generally consistent with the values and mission of the Council on Tall Buildings and Urban Habitat (CTBUH).

The criteria for the Innovation Award:

Demonstrate a specific area of innovation within design or construction.
Should be applicable to other tall building projects.
Single innovative element (single project can be nominated multiple times for different innovations)
Building can also be submitted for Best Tall Building Award

The criteria for the 10 Year Award:

Demonstrate successful performance over time.
Must have been completed between 10–12 years since the current award year (In the inaugural year submissions of buildings completed between 10–15 years since the current award year will be considered).

The Council on Tall Buildings and Urban Habitat bestowed a new award for Burj Khalifa at its annual "Best Tall Buildings Awards Ceremony" on 25 October 2010 when Burj Khalifa honored as first recipient of CTBUH's new Tall Building "Global Icon" Award. According to CTBUH the new "Global Icon" award recognizes those very special supertall skyscrapers that make a profound impact, not only on the local or regional context, but on the genre of tall buildings globally. Which is innovative in planning, design and execution, the building must have influenced and re-shaped the field of tall building architecture, engineering, and urban planning. It is intended that the award will only be conferred on an occasional basis, when merited by an exceptional project perhaps every ten or fifteen years.

Former CTBUH Awards Chair Gordon Gill, of Adrian Smith + Gordon Gill Architecture said:

"There was discussion amongst members of the jury that the existing 'Best Tall Building of the Year' award was not really appropriate for the Burj khalifa. We are talking about a building here that has changed the landscape of what is possible in architecture a building that became internationally recognized as an icon long before it was even completed. 'Building of the Century' was thought a more appropriate title for it."

Award winners

Individual award winners

Structural awards

2007

2008

2009

2010

2011

The Council on Tall Buildings and Urban Habitat announced the winners of its annual "Best Tall Building" awards for 2011 on June 15, 2011.

2012

2013

2014

2015

2016

2018

2019

See also

Council on Tall Buildings and Urban Habitat
List of architecture prizes

References

External links
CTBUH Awards Winners
Council on Tall Buildings and Urban Habitat Official Website

Architecture awards
Lifetime achievement awards
Skyscrapers
Awards established in 2002